Stuart A. Levey was the first Under Secretary for Terrorism and Financial Intelligence within the United States Department of the Treasury. He was sworn in on July 21, 2004 as a political appointee of President George W. Bush. President Barack Obama asked Levey to remain in his position and  Levey was one of only a small number of Senate-confirmed Bush appointees who served in the Obama Administration.

Education and Career
Stuart Levey grew up in a Jewish family near Akron, Ohio, where his father had practiced dentistry. Levey attended Harvard College, graduating summa cum laude in 1986, and in 1989 he graduated magna cum laude from Harvard Law School.  After law school, Levey clerked for Judge Laurence Silberman on the U.S. Court of Appeals for the D.C. Circuit from 1989 through 1990.

Prior to joining the Justice Department in 2001, Levey spent 11 years in private practice at the Washington law firm Miller, Cassidy, Larroca & Lewin LLP (which merged into Baker Botts LLP). He had a litigation practice with a special emphasis on white collar criminal defense.

Beginning in 2001, Levey served in several senior positions in the U.S. Department of Justice, including as Principal Associate Deputy Attorney General for Deputy Attorney General Larry Thompson and Deputy Attorney General James Comey. In that role, Levey was the Deputy Attorney General's primary advisor for coordinating the Department's counterterrorism and national security activities, including investigations, intelligence collection and prosecutions. Prior to serving in that role, Levey was an associate deputy attorney general and chief of staff to the deputy attorney general.

Levey was sworn in on July 21, 2004 as the Under Secretary of Terrorism and Financial Intelligence at the U.S. Department of the Treasury in the administration of President George W. Bush. President Barack Obama asked Levey to remain in his position and Levey was one of only a small number of Senate-confirmed Bush appointees who served in the Obama Administration. Levey served until March 2011. He was succeeded by David S. Cohen.

Levey played a central role in the efforts to combat North Korea's and Iran's allegedly illicit conduct in the international financial system.

In January 2012, Levey joined HSBC as the bank's Chief Legal Officer.

In August 2020, he became CEO of the Diem Association.

November 10, 2022, Oracle announced that Stuart Levey has been named executive vice president and chief legal officer.

Under Secretary for Terrorism and Financial Intelligence
As the first Under Secretary of the Treasury for Terrorism and Financial Intelligence (TFI), from July 2004, Levey was responsible for creating a new office to lead the Treasury Department's revitalized post-9/11 national security mission. Levey is credited with developing and executing financial strategies to counter threats to U.S. national security and protect the integrity of the international financial system.  He has also been recognized for leading the U.S. government's efforts to disrupt financial networks supporting terrorist organizations; developing and implementing financial measures against proliferators of weapons of mass destruction; and playing a central role in U.S. strategies to pressure the regimes in North Korea, Iran and Libya. He is credited, in particular, with designing the financial strategy that resulted in tremendous pressure on Iran's economy and its isolation from the international financial system.

One of Levey's key initiatives was harnessing the private sector to enhance the effectiveness of government-imposed financial measures.  He "led an effort to convince foreign banks to cease conducting business with Iran until that country agreed to comply with international banking standards. By showing companies and banks that doing business in Iran has financial and diplomatic repercussions, he has convinced corporations to cut off business with Iran." TFI's efforts received support from both Republicans  and Democrats.  Levey, an appointee of the George W. Bush administration, was asked to remain in his position by the Obama Administration.

TFI, through its implementation of economic sanctions and other financial measures, put pressure on the regimes in North Korea, Iran, and Libya. TFI was responsible for leading the U.S. government's efforts to cut off financing to terrorist organizations such as al-Qaeda, Hamas and Hezbollah.  In pursuing that effort against al Qaeda, Levey focused attention on wealthy Gulf-based donors, particularly from Saudi Arabia. He was once quoted as saying,"If I could somehow snap my fingers and cut off the funding from one country, it would be Saudi Arabia." No one identified by the United States and the United Nations as a terror financier has been prosecuted by the Saudis, he elaborated.  He later acknowledged significant improvement in the partnership between the U.S. and Saudi Arabia in targeting al-Qaeda financing.

In June 2006, the New York Times reported that counterterrorism officials had gained access to financial records from a vast international database of banking transactions involving Americans and others in the United States. In response to concerns about privacy issues, Levey said that the Terrorist Financing Tracking Program (TFTP) "has provided us with a unique and powerful window into the operations of terrorist networks and is, without doubt, a legal and proper use of our authorities." Since the creation of the TFTP, the United States and European Union (EU) have entered into a long-standing and comprehensive information sharing agreement to thwart the financing of terrorism around the world and gain timely, accurate, and reliable information about activities associated with suspected acts of terrorist planning and financing. A 2019 EU evaluation of the TFTP found that “over 70,000 leads were generated, some of which brought forward investigations into terrorist attacks on EU territory, such as those in Stockholm, Barcelona, and Turku. The number of leads increased considerably compared to almost 9,000 in the previous reporting period (1 March 2014 to 31 December 2015).” In November 2020, the Wall Street Journal reported that EU member countries widely use the TFTP to monitor global financial ties to terrorism and thwart terrorist actors.

In July 2010, Levey said that Anwar al-Awlaki "has proven that he is extraordinarily dangerous, committed to carrying out deadly attacks on Americans and others worldwide ... [and] has involved himself in every aspect of the supply chain of terrorism—fundraising for terrorist groups, recruiting and training operatives, and planning and ordering attacks on innocents."

Acting Treasury Secretary
On January 15, 2009 President-elect Barack Obama designated Levey to serve as Acting Treasury Secretary until Obama nominee Timothy Geithner was confirmed to the post. Geithner was confirmed on January 26.

Chief Legal Officer, HSBC Holdings plc
After leaving the U.S. Department of the Treasury, Levey served as the Chief Legal Officer and a Group Managing Director of HSBC Holdings plc, a global bank with 257,000 employees across 67 jurisdictions in 2014. Levey joined HSBC in 2012 as the bank was seeking to resolve investigations into past anti-money laundering and sanctions compliance failures and to re-build its reputation. Levey led a legal department made up of more than 800 lawyers in more than 50 countries, and re-focused the mission of the department to help the bank do what is legal and what is right. In a speech to The Economist’s General Counsel summit, Levey said that helping a business navigate the external environment requires its senior lawyers to be conscious not only of what the law is in any particular jurisdiction, but also of how the law might evolve in the future. Levey said that businesses must also be aware of how the company might be judged based on the application of broad standards, by several regulators, in numerous jurisdictions, all while acting with the benefit of hindsight. He said that for senior lawyers in a multinational corporation the questions of what is legal and what is right are inextricably linked.

In May of 2016, Levey wrote an op-ed in the Wall Street Journal in response to an effort by then-Secretary of State John Kerry to persuade major non-US banks to do business with Iran. In the op-ed, Levey stated that HSBC’s “decisions will be driven by the financial-crime risks and the underlying conduct,” and “[f]or these reasons, HSBC has no intention of doing any new business involving Iran.” He further noted that”[g]overnments can lift sanctions, but the private sector is still responsible for managing its own risk and no doubt will be held accountable if it falls short.”  He explained that the conduct that was the basis for Iran-related sanctions, including activities related to terrorism and proliferation of weapons of mass destruction, had not changed.

Upon Levey’s departure from HSBC in 2020, HSBC chief executive Noel Quinn sent an email to staff in which he said that Levey had been an “exemplary” chief legal officer after joining “at one of the most challenging moments in the Group’s history”. Quinn further noted that Levey “was a driving force behind the bank’s transformation in how we fight financial crime and helped us to rebuild our reputation, as well as the trust of our regulators and other government stakeholders.”

Stuart Gulliver, the former chief executive of HSBC, said that Levey was “the most important key hire” he made during his tenure.

Diem Association and Diem Networks US
In May of 2020, Levey was appointed the CEO of the Diem Association, a member-based association dedicated to building a blockchain-based payment system that supports financial innovation, inclusion, and integrity and is designed with robust controls to protect consumers and fight financial crime. Levey is also the CEO of Diem Networks US. 

On becoming the Diem Association’s CEO, Levey said that the project “charts a bold path forward to harness the power of technology to transform the global payments landscape,” and that Diem will “empower more than a billion people who have been left on the sidelines of the financial system, all with robust controls to detect and deter illicit financial activity.” 

Former US Secretary of the Treasury Henry Paulson, said: “The fact that Stuart is an expert at countering abuses of our financial system by terrorists [and] money launderers . . . gives me confidence that this digital currency is highly likely to set a standard for safety.” 

In May 2020, the Financial Times reported that Levey was reviewing Diem's plans for financial crime compliance and other critical controls to deter illegal and illicit use of the Diem blockchain and currency ahead of its launch, as well as to protect the privacy of users.

Under Levey's leadership, the Diem Association has made significant changes to the project that was initially rolled out as Libra in 2019, incorporating feedback from regulators. Levey has steered the Diem project to work “with regulators, central bankers, elected officials, and various stakeholders around the world to determine the best way to marry blockchain technology with accepted regulatory frameworks.” Levey has also said that a key objective of Diem is to promote the inclusion of billions of unbanked and underbanked people in the formal financial system. In 2020, Levey pointed to high-cost remittance fees in the developing world as a motivator for the Diem project.

Speaking to the American Banker, Levey emphasized how critical getting the protections right for the new payment system would be: “I personally want to build a project that has the type of financial crime controls that can even go beyond the effectiveness of the traditional banking system. We’re going to have world-class anti-money-laundering and sanctions controls.”

Criticism
According to The New York Times, the failure of the United States to carry out sanctions against many Iranian companies and individuals is cited by European diplomats as an example of America failing to do what it has promised. Valerie Lincy of Iran Watch has said, "The United States now lags many other countries in enforcing sanctions that the United Nations has already voted." The Tehran Times wrote that the U.S. Treasury has increased pressure on foreign banks not to deal with sanctions against Iran, including performing "U-turn transactions," which allow U.S. banks to process payments involving Iran that begin and end with a non-Iranian foreign bank.

In reply to Lincy's comments, Levey said that the United States has tougher sanctions on Iran than any other country. He said that because their list of organizations and individuals involved in financial crime is accurate, it is America's list that "is by and large used by financial institutions around the world."

References

External links

20th-century births
Living people
20th-century American Jews
21st-century American Jews
21st-century American politicians
Acting United States Secretaries of the Treasury
Harvard College alumni
Harvard Law School alumni
Obama administration cabinet members
Place of birth missing (living people)
Politicians from Akron, Ohio
United States Department of the Treasury officials
Year of birth missing (living people)